Marie Schlieps (1881-1919), was a Latvian (Baltic-German) deaconess.

She was executed during the Russian Bolshevik occupation in Riga in 1919. She became regarded as an Evangelical martyr.

References

 Frieder Schulz, Gerhard Schwinge (Hrsg.): Synaxis: Beiträge zur Liturgik. Vandenhoeck und Ruprecht, Göttingen 1997, ISBN 978-3-525-60398-7,

1881 births
1919 deaths
20th-century Latvian people
20th-century Latvian women
Lutheran deaconesses
20th-century Protestant martyrs